Sweet Degeneration is a 1997 Taiwanese drama film written and directed by Lin Cheng-sheng. It was entered into the 48th Berlin International Film Festival.

Cast
 Pen-yu Chang as Mei-li
 Shiang-chyi Chen as Ju-feng
 Shih-huang Chen as Father
 Leon Dai as Ah-hai
 Chao-yin Hsiao as Hsiao-lien
 Tze-min Hsiao as Mei-li's friend
 Kang-sheng Lee as Chun-sheng
 Su-feng Lee as Motel chef
 Chih-long Lin as Ah-ching
 Li-jung Lu as Prostitute
 Ming-Ching Lu as Ah-biao
 Mei-fong Yen as Motel chef

References

External links

1997 films
1997 drama films
1990s Mandarin-language films
Films directed by Lin Cheng-sheng
Taiwanese drama films